The Uruguay national futsal team represents Uruguay during international futsal competitions, such as the World Cup and the Copa América. It is governed by the Asociación Uruguaya de Fútbol.

Squad

Goalkeepers 
 1 Giani Barros
 12 Mauro Roibal
 13 Juan Pablo Montans

Field players 
 2 Fabian Hernandez
 3 Santiago Blankleider
 4 Jorge Sena
 5 Gonzalo Rodriguez
 6 Daniel Laurino
 7 Walter Skurko
 8 Miguel Aguirrezabala
 9 Nicolas Moliterno
 10 Andres D'Alessandro
 11 Martin Hernandez
 14 Gabriel De Simone

Results

FIFUSA/AMF Futsal World Cup record
 1982 –  3rd place
 1985 – 5th place
 1988 – 5th place
 1991 – 10th place
 1994 –  3rd place
 1997 –  2nd place
 2000 – 2nd round
 2003 – Did not play
 2007 – 1st round
 2011 – 1st round
 2015 – Quarterfinals
 2019 – To be determined

FIFA Futsal World Cup record
 1989 - Did not enter
 1992 - Did not enter
 1996 - 2nd round
 2000 - 1st round
 2004 - Did not play
 2008 - 1st round
 2012 - Did not play
 2016 - Did not play
 2020 - Did not qualify

Copa América de Futsal
 1965 -  2nd place
 1969 - 4th place
 1971 -  2nd place
 1973 -  2nd place
 1975 -  2nd place
 1976 -  3rd place
 1977 - 4th place
 1979 -  2nd place
 1983 -  3rd place
 1986 - 4th place
 1989 -  3rd place
 1992 – Did not play
 1995 –  3rd place
 1996 –  2nd place
 1997 – 4th place
 1998 –  3rd place
 1999 – 4th place
 2000 –  3rd place
 2003 – 4th place
 2008 –  2nd place
 2011 – 5th place
 2015 – 6th place
 2017 – 4th place
 2022 – 5th place

FIFA Futsal World Cup qualification (CONMEBOL)/CONMEBOL Preliminary Competition
 2012 – 5th place
 2016 – 4th place

Futsal Confederations Cup record
 2009 –  2nd place
 2013 – Did not enter
 2014 – Did not enter

Grand Prix de Futsal record
 2005 – 4th place
 2006 – Did not enter
 2007 – 7th place
 2008 – 11th place
 2009 – 13th place
 2010 – Did not enter
 2011 – 7th place
 2013 – Did not enter
 2014 – Did not enter
 2015 – 5th place
 2018 –  3rd place

Futsal Mundialito record
 1994 – Did not enter
 1995 – Did not enter
 1996 – Did not enter
 1998 – Did not enter
 2001 – 1st round
 2002 – Did not enter
 2006 – Did not enter
 2007 – Did not enter
 2008 – Did not enter

References

External links
 FIFA
 FIFA 
 CONMEBOL
 AUF Official Website
 Uruguay at FIFA site

South American national futsal teams
Futsal
Futsal in Uruguay